Walter Lowe (October 10, 1897 – March 7, 1951) was an American football player.  He played college football for Dubuque and Georgetown and professional football in the National Football League (NFL) as a back for the Rock Island Independents. He appeared in five NFL games, one as a starter, during the 1923 season.

References

1897 births
1951 deaths
Rock Island Independents players
Players of American football from Kansas
Georgetown Hoyas football players
Dubuque Spartans football players
Sportspeople from Hutchinson, Kansas